Nicholas Roberto Hațegan (born April 26, 2001) is an American professional soccer player who plays as an attacking midfielder for Liga III club Unirea Bascov.

Club career
At age 16, Hațegan became the first player signed from Sacramento Republic FC's U.S. Soccer Development Academy teams. Hategan made his professional debut against Pachuca on July 15, 2017, starting and playing 45 minutes against the Liga MX club. Prior to playing with the first team, Hategan spent two seasons with Republic FC's Academy.

In June 2019, Hațegan signed a contract with German club 1. FC Nürnberg.

Personal
Hațegan is of Romanian descent and holds dual American and Romanian citizenship.

Career statistics

References

External links 

 
 Sacramento Republic FC player profile

2001 births
Living people
American soccer players
Association football midfielders
United States men's youth international soccer players
Sacramento Republic FC players
Soccer players from California
Sportspeople from Roseville, California
American people of Romanian descent
USL Championship players
Liga I players
Liga II players
Liga III players
SSU Politehnica Timișoara players
FC Argeș Pitești players